The University of Tübingen has a long list of notable alumni and staff. As of 2021, eleven Nobel Laureates, 16 Leibniz Laureates and four Alexander von Humboldt Professorships are affiliated with the University.

The following list also includes alumni of the Tübinger Stift, which is not a part of the University, but has a close relationship with it.

Archaeology 
 Marija Gimbutas (1921–1994), archaeologist
 Manfred Korfmann (1942–2005), archaeologist, director of excavations in Troy
 Aurel Stein (1862–1943), archaeologist (PhD 1883)

Economics 
 Helmut Haussmann, German minister of economy (1988–1991)
 Horst Köhler, director of the IMF (2000–2004) and President of Germany (2004–2010)
 Jürgen Stark, Chief Economist and Member of the Executive Committee of the European Central Bank
 Klaus Töpfer, United Nations Under-Secretary-General and Executive-Director of the United Nations Environment Programme

Egyptology 
 Boyo Ockinga, Egyptologist

History 
 Ernst Boepple (1887–1950), German Nazi official and SS officer executed for war crimes
 Andrzej Ciechanowiecki (1924–2015), Polish economist, and collector 
 Kurt Georg Kiesinger, Chancellor of Germany (1966–1969)
 Hans Mommsen (1930–2015), historian
 Stephan Jakob Neher (1828–1902), Church historian
 Rita Süssmuth (1988–1998), president of the Bundestag, the German federal parliament
 Uwe Wolf (born 1961), musicologist

Indology and Hinduism 
 Heinrich von Stietencron, Indologist

Law 
 Gerhard Anschütz, father of the constitution of the Bundesland Hesse
 Martin Bangemann, German minister of economy (1984–1988) and EU commissioner (1989–1999)
 Fritz Bauer, German Jewish judge and chief prosecutor of Hesse (1956–1968)
 Julien Chaisse (born 1976), professor of law at the City University of Hong Kong
 Herta Däubler-Gmelin, German minister of justice (1998–2002)
 Wolfgang Ernst, legal historian and professor at the University of Oxford
 Roman Herzog, President of Germany (1994–1999)
 Klaus Hopt, German legal scholar
 Christine Hohmann-Dennhardt, politician and judge of the Federal Constitutional Court of Germany (1999–2011)
 Philipp Jenninger, President of the German federal parliament (1984–1988)
 Klaus Kinkel, vice-chancellor and minister of foreign affairs of Germany (1993–1998)
 Dieter Medicus, German legal scholar
 Gebhard Müller, President of the Federal Constitutional Court of Germany (1959–1971)
 Günther Oettinger, European Commissioner for Budget and Human Resources, Vice President of the Barroso II commission (2010–)
 Carlo Schmid, German politician and one of the "fathers of the constitution"
 Konstantin von Neurath, Minister of foreign affairs of Germany (1932–1938)
 Christoph Martin Wieland, (1733–1813), poet
 Jürgen Wöhler (b. 1950), German lawyer and manager

Medicine, natural sciences, mathematics 
 Yousef Al-Abed (b. 1964), chemist
 S. M. Razaullah Ansari (b. 1932), historian of science
 Alois Alzheimer, psychiatrist and neuropathologist
 Katrin Böhning-Gaese, biologist and ornithologist
 Simon Brendle (b. 1981), mathematician
 Victor von Bruns, surgeon
 Rudolf Jakob Camerarius (1665–1721), botanist, physicist
 Theodor Eimer (1843–1898), zoologist and comparative anatomist
 Leonhart Fuchs (1501–1566), botanist, physicist
 Hans Geiger (1882–1945), physicist
 Carl Haeberlin (1870–1954), physician
 Ingmar Hoerr (b. 1968), biologist
 Felix Hoppe-Seyler, chemist and physiologist
 Friedrich von Huene (1875–1969), paleontologist
 Johannes Kepler (1571–1630), astronomer
 Karl Meissner (1891–1959), physicist
 Julius Lothar Meyer (1830–1895), chemist
 Hugo von Mohl (1805–1872), botanist
 Friedrich Miescher, biologist
 Christiane Nüsslein-Volhard (b. 1942), biologist
 Hans Schlossberger (1887–1960), immunologist and microbiologist
 Wilhelm Schickard (1592–1635), astronomer
 Bernhard Schölkopf (b. 1968), computer scientist
 Johann Georg Gmelin (1709–1755), botanist
 Bei Shizhang (1903–2009), biologist
 Karl von Vierordt, physiologist (1818–1884)
 Detlef Weigel (b. 1961), biologist

Philology 
 Rabbi David Zvi Hoffmann, Rabbi
 Johann Reuchlin, humanist and philosopher
 Friedrich Hölderlin, poet
 Georg Wilhelm Friedrich Hegel, philosopher
 Alberto Jori, philosopher
 Heinrich Christoph Wilhelm Sigwart, philosopher
 Christoph von Sigwart, philosopher
 Friedrich Wilhelm Joseph Schelling, philosopher
 Ernst Bloch, philosopher
 Burghart Schmidt, philosopher
 Otfried Höffe, philosopher
 Julian Nida-Rümelin, philosopher
 Ernst Tugendhat, philosopher
 Manfred Frank, philosopher

Psychology 
 Paul Enck, psychologist specializing in psychosomatic medicine
 Wolfgang Köhler, psychologist
 Robert Zajonc (1923–2008), psychologist

Sociology 
 Ralf Dahrendorf, sociologist, economist, political scientist and politician

Theology 
 Karl Barth, Swiss, Reformed,  20th century  Protestant theologian
 Ferdinand Christian Baur, Protestant theologian and historian of early Christianity and the New Testament
 Dietrich Bonhoeffer, Lutheran, 20th century  Protestant theologian,  opponent of the Nazi Regime
 Rudolf Bultmann,   20th century  Protestant theologian known for existential biblical interpretation
 Gerhard Ebeling, Protestant theologian, former student of Rudolf Bultmann, specialist in philosophical hermeneutics
 Johannes Eck (1486–1543), Catholic theologian, counter-Reformer
 David F. Ford, Regius Professor of Divinity at the University of Cambridge (since 1991)
 Romano Guardini, Roman Catholic priest, author and academic
 Walter Kasper, Cardinal in the Roman Catholic Church, very  Roman Catholic theologian of today
 Hans Küng,  Roman Catholic theologian, critic of Catholic doctrine
 Philip Melanchthon (1497–1560), Protestant reformer, first systematic theologian of the Protestant Reformation
 Eduard Mörike, Protestant theologian,  German poet
 Jürgen Moltmann,    Protestant theologian
 Konrad Raiser, Protestant theologian, former General Secretary of the World Council of Churches (WCC)
 Charles-Frédéric Reinhard (1761–1837), Württembergian-born French diplomat, essayist, and politician
 Friedrich Wilhelm Joseph Schelling, Protestant theologian,  philosopher
 Adolf Schlatter,  Protestant theologian
 David Strauss,  Protestant theologian and writer who revolutionized the study of the New Testament
 Paul Tillich, German-American theologian at Harvard University,  Protestant theologian
 Miroslav Volf, Christian theologian at Yale University
 Karl Heinrich Weizsäcker, Protestant theologian and chancellor of the University of Tübingen

References 

University of Tübingen
Tübingen